is a Japanese motorcycle racer. He has competed in the MFJ All Japan Road Race GP125 Championship, the Red Bull MotoGP Rookies Cup, the MFJ All Japan J-GP3 Championship and the MFJ All Japan Road Race ST600 Championship.

Career statistics

Grand Prix motorcycle racing

By season

Races by year

References

External links

Japanese motorcycle racers
Living people
1993 births
125cc World Championship riders